Grasslands are areas where the vegetation is dominated by grasses and other herbaceous plants.

Grassland or Grasslands may also refer to:

 Cypress Hills—Grasslands, a federal electoral district in Saskatchewan, Canada
 Grasslands Entertainment, a Canadian television production and distribution company
 Grasslands National Park, one of Canada's newer national parks
 Grassland (Annapolis Junction, Maryland), listed on the NRHP in Anne Arundel County, Maryland, USA